The 1927 New Mexico Lobos football team represented the University of New Mexico as an independent during the 1927 college football season. In their eighth season under head coach Roy W. Johnson, the Lobos compiled an 8–0–1 record, shut out five of nine opponents, and outscored all opponents by a total of 215 to 73.

Two New Mexico players were recognized as first-team players on the 1927 All-Southwest football team selected by Bob Ingram of the El Paso Post: Malcolm Long at quarterback and Bob Crist at end. Long was also selected as the team's most valuable player. Halfback Geard "Rusty" Armstrong from Roswell was the team captain.

Schedule

References

New Mexico
New Mexico Lobos football seasons
College football undefeated seasons
New Mexico Lobos football